The Tarnhelm is a magic helmet in Richard Wagner's Der Ring des Nibelungen (written 1848–1874; first perf. 1876).  It was crafted by Mime at the demand of his brother Alberich.  It is used as a cloak of invisibility by Alberich in Das Rheingold. It also allows one to change one's form: 
Alberich changes to a dragon and then a toad in Das Rheingold, Scene 3.
Fafner changes to a dragon after the end of Das Rheingold and appears thus in Siegfried Act II. (It is never made clear whether Fafner actually used the Tarnhelm to transform, or simply transformed as many giants and gods did in the myths. There is also no Tarnhelm present in the original Andvari myth from Reginsmál in the Poetic Edda from which Wagner drew inspiration for this scene.)
Siegfried changes to Gunther's form in Götterdämmerung Act I, Scene 3.
Finally, it allows one to travel long distances instantly, as Siegfried does in Götterdämmerung, Act II.
The stage directions in Das Rheingold and Siegfried describe it as a golden chain-mail helmet which covers the wearer's face.

In politics
Nacht und Nebel ("Night and Fog") was a directive of Adolf Hitler on 7 December 1941 that was originally intended to remove all political activists and resistance "helpers"; "anyone endangering German security"  throughout Nazi Germany's occupied territories. The name was a direct reference to a magic spell involving the "Tarnhelm" ("stealth helmet") from Wagner's Rheingold.

In popular culture
The 1957 Warner Bros. cartoon What's Opera, Doc?, a comedy on opera in general and Wagner's Ring Cycle in particular, has Elmer Fudd wearing a magic helmet that is meant to suggest Tarnhelm.
The Dungeons & Dragons game includes a magic item called the helm of teleportation (Gygax & Arneson, 1974 D&D Volume 2, p. 37), which functions like Siegfried's use of the Tarnhelm in Act II, Scene 2.
In Marvel's Thor an adaption was done of the Ring Cycle, in which the Tarnhelm appeared.
The Tarnhelm is an integral part of Michael Scott Rohan's Winter of the World trilogy, which repurposes many Norse myths.
The main character in Brenda Clough's novel How Like a God can psionically obstruct other people from seeing him, a process he refers to as "tarnhelm".
The Tarnhelm is an item found in the PC game Diablo II.
Operation Tarnhelm is the name of the expansion pack for the PC strategy game Naval War: Arctic Circle, which features new stealth units supposedly invisible to radar.
In The Lord of the Rings, Éowyn adopts the name "Dernhelm" when she masquerades as a man before slaying the Witch-King of Angmar; "Dernhelm" is the Old English equivalent of "Tarnhelm".

See also
 Huliðshjálmr (concealing helmet) of Norse dwarves
 Fafnir's helmet Aegis

References

Helmets
Mythological clothing
Magic items
Der Ring des Nibelungen